Marlon Hermenson Trejo García (born December 31, 1988 in Usulután, El Salvador) is a Salvadoran professional footballer who plays as a midfielder.

Honours

Player

Club
C.D. Luis Ángel Firpo
 Primera División
 Champion: Clausura 2013

C.D. Águila
 Primera División
 Champion: Clausura 2019
 Runners-up: Clausura 2016

References

1988 births
Living people
Salvadoran footballers
El Salvador international footballers
C.D. Luis Ángel Firpo footballers
C.D. Águila footballers
Association football midfielders